Atassut (also referred to as Feeling of Community) is a liberal-conservative and unionist political party in Greenland. Founded on 29 April 1978, Atassut is an established partner of the Liberal Party of Denmark.

History
Atassut was established in late 1976 as a political movement of conservative and unionist forces in Greenland to oppose Siumut with Lars Chemnitz as its leading figure, though it soon became more liberal.

Its first programme from January 1977 stated that its purpose was to "promote Greenlandic home rule within the Unity of the Realm" and "work against secession from the Danish realm."

Atassut was founded as a political party on 29 April 1978. The party's name literally translates as "link" (in the context of being linked with Denmark as part of the Danish realm), but can also refer to a roof which binds a house together.

Previously one of the two largest and most influential political parties in Greenland, the Atassut has seen its share of the popular vote consistently decline since the mid-1990s.

In the 2001 Folketing election, the party lost its only representative and has never regained a seat in the Danish parliament.

In the June 2009 snap election the party dropped to 10.9% of the vote, and lost 3 of its 6 seats. In the following election in 2013 the party was reduced to two seats, which they maintained in the 2014 elections despite fewer votes. Both MPs later defected to Siumut, one of whom was its chairman Knud Kristiansen.

From the 2014 parliamentary election to 2016 Atassut was a part of a coalition government, led by Kim Kielsen from Siumut, that also including the Inuit Ataqatigiit.

In debate of refugees in Greenland in 2017, Atassut and Atassut Youths have been strong on not accepting refugees in to Greenland, where Inuit Ataqatigiit and Siumut want to take in refugees.

In the 2018 general election, Atassut gained two seats in the Inatsisartut despite having no incumbents after both their MPs had defected to Siumut. In the 2021 election Atassut retained its two seats. Following the election, Atassut offered external support to the governing coalition formed by the Inuit Ataqatigiit and Naleraq parties.

Ideology
Atassut has been referred to as liberal, conservative, and liberal-conservative. The party supports privatisation of public industries, a form of citizen's income, NATO co-operation, and Greenlandic affiliation with the European Union.

The party was previously opposed to Greenlandic home rule; Atassut later shifted to supporting home rule and autonomy, but without leaving the unity of the Realm. The party has moved from a traditional right-wing position towards later supporting the subsidisation of primary-sector business, alongside the centre-left Siumut party.

Election results

Parliament of Greenland (Inatsisartut)

Parliament of the Kingdom of Denmark (Folketinget)

Atassut was already established as a political movement at the time of the Folketing election on 15 February 1977, and the three Atassut founders Arqalo Abelsen, Ole Berglund and Otto Steenholdt ran as an association of candidates, which got 8,391 votes and Otto Steenholdt elected.

Leaders 
2019– Aqqalu Jerimiassen
2017–2019 Siverth K. Heilmann
2017 Qulutannguaq Inuk Berthelsen (acting; after Knud Kristiansen left the party)
2014–2017 Knud Kristiansen
2009–2014 Gerhardt Petersen
2005–2009 Finn Karlsen
2002–2005 Augusta Salling
1993–2002 Daniel Skifte
1989–1993 Konrad Steenholdt
1985–1989 Otto Steenholdt
1979–1984 Lars Chemnitz

Notes

References

External links
Atassut official site (archive)

Greenlandic unionism
Nordic agrarian parties
Conservative liberal parties
Liberal parties in Greenland
Political parties in Greenland
1976 establishments in Greenland
Political parties established in 1976
Conservative parties in Greenland